Sheelu Abraham is an Indian actress who mostly appears in Malayalam films.

Sheelu began her acting career in Weeping Boy, but it was the movie She Taxi which gave her recognition. She played the lead roles in films like Star and Vidhi, produced by Abraham Mathew, her husband, under the banner Abaam Movies.

Filmography

Television

References

External links
 

21st-century Indian actresses
Malayali people
Living people
Actresses from Kerala
Actresses in Malayalam cinema
Year of birth missing (living people)